The IV Bolivarian Games (Spanish: Juegos Bolivarianos) were a multi-sport event held between December 3–16, 1961, at the Estadio Municipal in Barranquilla, Colombia. The Games were organized by the Bolivarian Sports Organization (ODEBO). Bolivia was the only eligible country not to send a delegation.

The Games were officially opened by Colombian president Alberto Lleras Camargo. Torch lighter was hurdler Jaime Aparicio.  The athlete's oath was sworn by local athlete Rafael Cotes.

A detailed history of the early editions of the Bolivarian Games between 1938 and 1989 was published in a book written (in Spanish) by José Gamarra Zorrilla, former president of the Bolivian Olympic Committee, and first president (1976-1982) of ODESUR.  Gold medal winners from Ecuador were published by the Comité Olímpico Ecuatoriano.

Participation 
Athletes from 5 countries were reported to participate:

Sports 
The following sports were explicitly mentioned:

Aquatic sports 
 Diving
 Swimming
 Athletics
 Baseball
 Basketball
 Boxing
Cycling 
 Road cycling
 Track cycling
 Fencing
 Football
 Shooting
 Tennis
 Weightlifting
 Wrestling

The list might be incomplete.

Medal count
The medal count for these Games is tabulated below.  This table is sorted by the number of gold medals earned by each country.  The number of silver medals is taken into consideration next, and then the number of bronze medals.

References 

Bolivarian Games
B
B
Bolivar
Bolivarian Games
Multi-sport events in Colombia
Sport in Barranquilla
December 1961 sports events in South America